Jonathan Marshall (born September 16, 1997) is an American football defensive tackle for the Pittsburgh Steelers of the National Football League (NFL). He played college football at Arkansas.

Professional career

New York Jets
Marshall was drafted by the New York Jets in the sixth round, 207th overall, of the 2021 NFL Draft. On May 7, 2021, Marshall officially signed with the Jets.

On August 30, 2022, Marshall was waived by the Jets and signed to the practice squad the next day.

Pittsburgh Steelers
On December 14, 2022, the Pittsburgh Steelers signed Marshall off the Jets practice squad to their active roster.

Personal life
His cousin, Cedric Reed, is a former National Football League player. He is also related to Cedrick Hardman, who played in the NFL for the San Francisco 49ers and Oakland Raiders from 1970 to 1981, winning Super Bowl XV with the Raiders in 1981.

References

External links 
Arkansas Razorbacks bio

Living people
Arkansas Razorbacks football players
New York Jets players
People from Shepherd, Texas
Players of American football from Texas
American football defensive tackles
1997 births